"Bayou Pon Pon" is a song by Jimmie Davis.  Davis composed it with Hank Williams.

Background
Williams and Davis' most successful collaboration would be "(I Heard That) Lonesome Whistle," which  would rise to #8 for Williams on the country singles chart in 1951.  Davis would also record another song that he wrote with Williams called "Forever is a Long, Long Time."  Just about all of the songs Williams pitched to other artists were flops on the charts, including "I Can't Escape from You" by Ray Price, "Countyfied" and "The Little House We Built (Just o'er the Hill)" by Big Bill Lister, "A Stranger in the Night" by George Morgan, and "Me and My Broken Heart" by Carl Smith.  The prolific Williams, who peddled songs throughout his recording career, possessed a savvy instinct for knowing which songs to keep for himself.

Discography

References

1951 songs
Jimmie Davis songs
Songs written by Jimmie Davis
Songs written by Hank Williams